Saak or SAAK may refer to:

Saak (film), 2019 Indian Punjabi language film
Eta Boötis, a binary star in the constellation of Boötes that also bore the traditional names Muphrid and Saak
Martín García Island Airport, in Argentina having the ICAO sign SAAK
 an alternative of the Armenian name Sahak or Sahag (for the name Isaac)
 a name for pinenut in several Ohlone languages of California

People with the given name
Saak Karapetyan (1960–2018), Russian deputy attorney general of Armenian descent